Regional Air was an airline based in Madang, Papua New Guinea. It operated scheduled and charter passenger services. Its main bases were Madang Airport and Jacksons International Airport, Port Moresby.

The airline operated from 2002 until 2005, when it was merged into Hevilift.

Code data 

IATA Code: QT

Fleet 

As of August 2006 the Regional Air fleet includes:

1 de Havilland Canada DHC-6 Twin Otter Series 200
3 de Havilland Canada DHC-6 Twin Otter Series 300

As of January 2005 the fleet also includes:

1 Raytheon Beech King Air B200

References

External links
 

Airlines of Papua New Guinea